Sandra Jill James is an American biochemist and autism researcher who studies metabolic autism biomarkers. She works at Arkansas Children's Hospital Research Institute, where she is the director of the Metabolic Genomics Laboratory, as well as the University of Arkansas for Medical Sciences's department of pediatrics, where she has worked since 2002. She is also a member of the Autism Speaks Treatment Advisory Board, and is also a scientific advisor to the autism foundation N of One. Her current research focuses on the role of epigenetics in causing autism, as well as the effectiveness of supplements as a treatment for autism and the potential existence of abnormal metabolism in autistic children. This research is funded by a 5-year grant from the National Institutes of Health entitled "Metabolic biomarkers of autism: predictive potential and genetic susceptibility," as well as by a grant from Autism Speaks.

Education
James obtained her bachelor's degree in biology from Mills College in 1962, followed by an M.S. and Ph.D. from the University of California, Los Angeles in 1982 and 1986, respectively.

Research
James, while at the NCTR, conducted research on the role of DNA methylation and cancer susceptibility, and also studied metabolic differences in children with Down syndrome. Her studies of children with Down syndrome showed that they have abnormal methionine metabolic pathways.

Leukemia
James has also researched children suffering from leukemia in Fallon, Nevada. She originally received a grant from the EPA to conduct this research in 2004, and presented preliminary results the following year, in which she reported that the Fallon children have a metabolic predisposition to develop leukemia, though the cancer itself is caused by environmental contaminants. She never published her final results, because she only had 20 blood samples--"not enough to reach a conclusive result."

Autism
James is best known for her autism-related research. Regarding autism, James' view is that the transsulfuration pathway is disrupted in autistic children, resulting in these children being deficient in glutathione, as well as vitamins such as vitamin B6 and vitamin B12, and that maternal glutathione deficiency may also be a risk factor for autism. She has also found that administering these compounds as supplements, as well as methylcobalamin and folinic acid, to autistic children can significantly restore their levels of glutathione and cysteine and may therefore be useful in the treatment of autism. In addition, she has produced evidence that autistic children also suffer from impaired methylation capacity and that, according to a study she presented at the 2005 Experimental Biology conference, they have a unique biological "fingerprint" in their blood which neurotypical children lack. With regard to this particular study, James said that "One interpretation of this finding is that children with autism would be less able to detoxify and eliminate these heavy metals." According to the official blog of Autism Speaks, James found that autistic children exhibit abnormal folate metabolism that is detectable by higher levels of plasma homocysteine, adenosine, and S-adenosyl-L-homocysteine in the mothers of these children. Her glutathione-related research has been cited by anti-vaccinationists such as Robert F. Kennedy, Jr., Dan Olmsted, and David Kirby as evidence that autistic children lack sufficient glutathione to remove mercury from their bodies and are therefore more susceptible to the toxicity of mercury in vaccines. However, James herself has cautioned against such conclusions, saying they are an overstatement of what her research actually shows; with specific regard to Kirby's claims, she said, "I'm afraid Mr. Kirby is overstating our conclusions -- which did not mention mercury. We simply showed for the first time that children with autism have lower levels of the major intracellular antioxidant, glutathione, which incidentally happens to be the major mechanism for mercury elimination from the body." On March 27, 2012, the Jane Botsford Johnson Foundation awarded a $1.2 million research grant to Arkansas Children's Hospital to fund research into autism biomarkers; this research will be led by James. At the time the grant was being awarded, Johnson herself said that "Jill James' work at ACHRI holds great promise for the future of autism therapy and prevention."

In vitro studies
Another field of her research that has attracted attention is a number of in vitro studies she has conducted regarding the toxicity of thimerosal to neuronal and glial cells; which, she has concluded, is mediated by glutathione. She has said that these results "suggest that these children may have an increased vulnerability to pro-oxidant environmental exposures and a lower threshold for oxidative neurotoxicity and immunotoxicity."

References

External links
University of Arkansas for Medical Sciences Faculty page 

Autism researchers
Living people
Mills College alumni
University of Arkansas for Medical Sciences faculty
University of California, Los Angeles alumni
Year of birth missing (living people)